Howard Arthur Allen (February 10, 1949 – June 5, 2020) was an American serial killer from Indianapolis, Indiana. He murdered three elderly people and also committed assault, burglary, and arson.

Early life 
Allen was one of eight children who were raised by an impoverished single mother. He sometimes stole food for the family. Allen was enrolled in special education classes for mentally disabled children, and was still reading at a second grade level when he left elementary school. A special education director said Allen "had difficulty processing language" as a child, that his "thinking and decision-making would be very concrete," and that he "could have difficulty understanding the consequences of his conduct and could be easily led."

There were disputes over whether Allen was mentally disabled, since he scored 104 on an IQ test and his mother called him an "average" student. None of Allen's family members described him as anything other than of normal intelligence, nor did any of eighteen people who submitted letters on his behalf before sentencing.

Crimes 
In August 1974, Allen beat 85-year-old Opal Cooper during a burglary. He was sentenced to 2-21 years in prison for voluntary manslaughter, winning parole in 1985.

On June 11, 1988, Allen was sentenced to death for the murder of Ernestine Griffin. He received a concurrent 50-year sentence for robbery with serious bodily injury, and a consecutive 38-year sentence for theft. On August 30, 1988, he was placed on death row where he spent the next 25 years awaiting a ruling by a U.S. district court on a petition for a writ of habeas corpus. After years of unsuccessful attempts to prove that he was mentally disabled and thus ineligible for execution, one of Allen's appeals was successful. He was resentenced to 60 years in prison for the murder. The Indiana Department of Correction had listed his release date as April 23, 2035. Allen was imprisoned at the Wabash Valley Correctional Facility.

Allen died on June 5, 2020, at the age of 71. His death was confirmed by the Indiana Department of Correction.

See also
 List of serial killers in the United States

References

External links
Indiana Department of Corrections Website / Offender Search DOC Number:	881978

1949 births
2020 deaths
20th-century American criminals
American male criminals
American people convicted of murder
American people convicted of manslaughter
American people convicted of robbery
American people convicted of theft
American prisoners sentenced to death
American serial killers
Male serial killers
People convicted of murder by Indiana
People from Indianapolis
Prisoners sentenced to death by Indiana
Prisoners who died in Indiana detention
Serial killers who died in prison custody